The Sts. Peter and Paul Cathedral also simply called Cathedral of Parakou, is a religious building in the Catholic Church is located in the town of Parakou, in the Borgou department in the north part of the African country of Benin.

Its history dates back to 1944 when the parish church of St. Peter and St. Paul opened (L'église paroissiale Saints Pierre et Paul) created by the Society of African Missions and became its first pastor Father Roger Barthelemy, but it was only formally blessed in 1958. it was elevated to cathedral in 1964 when the diocese was created.

It has a baroque style and some stained glass depicting scenes of the Apostles Peter and Paul. It serves as the headquarters of the Archdiocese of Parakou (Archidioecesis Parakuensis) which was created in 1997 by Pope John Paul II by the bull "Successoris Petri".

See also
Roman Catholicism in Benin
Sts. Peter and Paul Cathedral

References

Roman Catholic cathedrals in Benin
Parakou
Roman Catholic churches completed in 1944
20th-century Roman Catholic church buildings